The Eswatini national football team, nicknamed Sihlangu Semnikati (King's Shield), represents Eswatini, formerly known as Swaziland, in international football and is controlled by the Eswatini Football Association. It has never qualified for the World Cup or the Africa Cup of Nations finals. Swaziland's best performance in an international tournament is a semi-final finish in the COSAFA Cup.

On 8 June 2008, they achieved their first win in a World Cup qualifier since 1992, beating 2006 finalists Togo 2–1 on home soil. The team's best recent performance came in 2017 Africa Cup of Nations qualification where Eswatini finished second in Group L above Guinea and Malawi.

History

Beginnings

The team played its first international match against Malawi, winning 2–0. For the first decade, the national team only played Malawi and Zambia, failing to register a single win from 1969 until 1984, when they beat Lesotho 3–1 in a friendly at home. Following the Lesotho win, Eswatini entered the 1986 African Cup of Nations qualifiers for the first time, losing 1–8 on aggregate to Zimbabwe. The team then entered the 1987 All-Africa Games qualifiers however they lost 2–9 on aggregate against Malawi. 

The first time that Eswatini progressed past the first round of a qualifying competition was for the 1990 African Cup of Nations qualifiers, beating Tanzania 3–1 on penalties after drawing the tie 2–2. In the second round they faced Malawi who knocked them out again, 1–3 after two legs. Eswatini next entered the 1990 SADCC Tournament, advancing past the group stage on goal difference ahead of Malawi, before losing to Zimbabwe on penalties (5–3) in the semi-finals following a 4–4 draw after extra-time. In the 1992 African Cup of Nations qualifiers, Eswatini beat Zambia (2–1) during the preliminary group stage but finished in third and failed to progress. 

Eswatini entered the 1994 FIFA World Cup qualifiers for the first time, but ended up in second place behind Cameroon thereby not advancing to the final round. For the 1998 World Cup first qualification round, Eswatini lost twice to Gabon (0–1 and 0–2) and were eliminated. They failed to make it past the first qualifying round for the inaugural 1997 COSAFA Cup, where they lost 0–4 to Mozambique, and in the 1998 COSAFA Cup where they lost to an own-goal in extra-time against Angola (0–1). Eswatini returned to the 2000 African Cup of Nations qualification matches after missing the previous three tournaments but they fell 2–3 against Madagascar and were eliminated. They managed to qualify for the 1999 COSAFA Cup after beating Mozambique 3–1 in the qualifiers, then beat Zimbabwe in the quarter-finals 4–3 on penalties after drawing 1–1 in regular time, with Bongani Mdluli having scored the equaliser for Eswatini in the 89th minute. In the semi-finals they lost to Namibia on penalties, 2–4.

21st century

Eswatini were eliminated by Angola in the 2002 World Cup qualifiers, losing 1–8 on aggregate. They then lost to Kenya in the 2002 African Cup of Nations qualification round 3–5. Their next success in a competition came in the 2002 COSAFA Cup where they qualified ahead of Namibia (2–1) and beat Zimbabwe (2–0) to advance to the semis. There they lost to South Africa (1–4) who would go on to win the tournament. In the 2004 AFCON qualifiers, Eswatini finished third in their group, two points behind Libya and three behind DR Congo therefore missing out on qualification.

In the following tournaments, Eswatini failed to progress past the first qualifying round. They finished bottom of their qualifying groups until 2017 Africa Cup of Nations qualification where they finished in second on goal-difference ahead of Guinea but were three points off of qualifying, behind Zimbabwe. In the 2018 World Cup qualifying, Eswatini thrashed Djibouti 8–1 over two legs, but were beaten 0–2 by Nigeria to end their hopes of qualification.

Recent results

The following is a list of match results in the last 12 months, as well as any future matches that have been scheduled.

2022

2023

Coaches
Caretaker managers are listed in italics.

 Ted Dumitru (1983–85)
 Dumisa Mahlalela (1992–93)
 Scara Thindwa (1996)
 Jan Simulambo (1997)
 Francis Banda (1998–2000)
 Dumisa Mahlalela (2001–02)
 Mandla Dlamini (2003)
 Francis Banda (2003)
 Werner Bicklehaput (2003)
 Dumisa Mahlalela (2004)
 Francis Banda (2005)
 Jan Van Winckel (2006)
 Ayman El Yamani (2006–07)
 Martin Chabangu (2007)
 Raoul Savoy (2007–08)
 Ephraim Mashaba (2008–10)
 Musa Zwane (2010–11)
 Obed Mlotsa (2011)
 Caleb Ngwenya (2011–12)
 Valere Billen (2012–13)
 Harris Bulunga (2013–14)
 Harris Bulunga (2014–16)
 Anthony Mdluli (2017)
 Hendrik Pieter de Jongh (2017–18)
 Anthony Mdluli (2018)
 Kosta Papic (2018–2019)
 Dominic Kunene (2020–2022)

Players

Current squad
The following players were called up for the 2023 AFCON qualification matches against Cape Verde on 24 and 28 March 2023.

Caps and goals correct as of: 15 July 2022, after the match against

Recent call-ups
The following players were called up for Eswatini in the last 12 months.

Player records

Players in bold are still active with Eswatini.

Competitive record

FIFA World Cup

Africa Cup of Nations

COSAFA Cup

References

External links
 

 
African national association football teams